Glück und Benzin is the fourth studio album by German recording artist Miss Platnum, released by Four Music on March 14, 2014 in German-speaking Europe. Her first German language album, it marked a transition from the hip hop–driven Balkan pop style from her previous records, Chefa (2007) and The Sweetest Hangover (2009), which was largely inspired by her 2012 number-one hit single "Lila Wolken" with rappers Marteria and Yasha. Consequently, it incorporates contemporary R&B and electropop styles with elements from other genres of music, including dance and PBR&B.

Again, Platnum enlisted longtime collaborators David Conen, Vincent von Schlippenbach, and Dirk Berger from production trio The Krauts to work with her on Gluck und Benzin. Upon its release, they received generally mixed to positive reviews for their effort. The album debuted at number thirty-four on the German Albums Chart.

Track listing

Charts

Weekly charts

References

Miss Platnum albums
2014 albums